Perpetrator is a 2023 American-French co-production horror film, written and directed by Jennifer Reeder and starring Kiah McKirnan, Alicia Silverstone, Chris Lowell and Melanie Liburd. The film follows Jonny, an impulsive teenage girl living in a town where young women continue to go missing.

It is nominated to compete for the Panorama Audience Award at the 73rd Berlin International Film Festival, where it had its world premiere on February 17, 2023. The film is also nominated for Best Feature Film Teddy Award.

Cast
 Kiah McKirnan as Jonny
 Alicia Silverstone as Hildie
 Chris Lowell as Principal Burke
 Melanie Liburd as Jean
 Ireon Roach as Elektra

Production
Jennifer Reeder's second feature to screen at Berlinale, following 2019's Knives and Skin, is produced by newly turned producers, Paris-based sales agent WTFilms. It also marks her third collaboration with Shudder, since 2021 anthology film V/H/S/94 and 2022 film Night’s End. Reeder and her crew shot Perpetrator in Chicago during March 2022, which she described as "a miserable time to shoot a film, but we got beautiful footage."

Release

Perpetrator had its premiere on February 17, 2023, as part of the 73rd Berlin International Film Festival, in Panorama.

It was reported on December 16, 2022, that Shudder, AMC Networks streaming service for horror, thriller has acquired the distribution rights.

Reception
On the review aggregator Rotten Tomatoes website, the film has an approval rating of 80% based on 10 reviews, with an average rating of 6.3/10. On Metacritic, it has a weighted average score of 63 out of 100 based on 6 reviews, indicating "Generally Favorable Reviews".

Jessica Kiang reviewing at Berlin Film Festival, for Variety wrote, "The tonal uncertainty is hardly helped by an arch performance style that too often strays closer to play-acting than acting — an impression enhanced by the disparity in age between much of the principal cast and the teenagers they’re playing." Jude Dry reviewing for IndieWire graded the film B- and wrote, that the film "suffers from a novice lead performance and a script that tries to do too much." Dry praising Silverstone stated, "she is a steely delight as the sharp-tongued and demanding mystery lady." Concluding she said, "There are satisfying genre elements, to be sure, Perpetrator cannot be accused of playing it safe."

Accolades

References

External links
 
 
 

2023 films
2023 LGBT-related films
American LGBT-related films
French horror films
2023 horror films
American horror films
LGBT-related horror films
2020s English-language films
2020s American films
French LGBT-related films
2020s French films